Massimo Urbani (8 May 1957 – 24 June 1993) was an Italian jazz alto saxophonist. He played principally in the bebop style.

Life and career
Urbani was born in Primavalle, Rome on 8 May 1957, the oldest of five brothers. His first instrument, from 1968, was the clarinet, but he soon switched to the alto saxophone.

Urbani died of a heroin overdose on 23 June 1993. The Penguin Guide to Jazz commented that "Urbani's senseless death robbed Europe of a player whose records are a flawed testament to a bopper of enormous guts and facility."

Discography
 1974 Jazz a Confronto 13 (Horo)
 1977 Invitation  (Philology
 1979 360° Aeutopia (Red)
 1980 Dedications to A.A. & J.C. – Max's Mood (Red)
 1981 Go Max Go (Philology)
 1983 Max Leaps In with Tullio De Piscopo, Mike Melillo, Massimo Moriconi)
 1984 The Urbisaglia Voncert (Philology)
 1987 Easy to Love (Red)
 1987 Duets Improvisations for Yardbird with Mike Melillo (Philology)
 1988 Urlo  (Elicona)
 1990 Out of Nowhere (Splasc) 
 1991 Round About Max with Strings (Sentemo)
 1993 The Blessing (Red)

References

External links

1957 births
1993 deaths
20th-century Italian people
Italian saxophonists
Male saxophonists
Jazz saxophonists
20th-century Italian musicians
20th-century saxophonists
20th-century Italian male musicians
Male jazz musicians